Andrew Mitchell (before 1875 – after 1894) was a Scottish footballer who played at full back. He played for Airdrieonians, Newton Heath and Burton Swifts in the late 19th century.

External links
MUFCInfo.com profile
 Andrew Mitchell, united.co

Scottish footballers
Airdrieonians F.C. (1878) players
Manchester United F.C. players
Burton Swifts F.C. players
Year of birth missing
19th-century births
Year of death missing
Place of birth missing
Place of death missing
Football Alliance players
Association football fullbacks